One Way Pendulum may refer to:

One Way Pendulum (play) – 1959 English play
One Way Pendulum (film) – 1964 film, based on the above